Moloch is the name of a god associated with child sacrifice in the Hebrew Bible and with Phoenician religion.

Moloch may also refer to:
 Moloch horridus, also known as the Australian thorny devil, the sole lizard species of the genus Moloch
 Moloch (1999 film), a biographical film by Alexander Sokurov about Adolf Hitler
 Moloch (2022 film), a Dutch folk horror film
 Moloch (Dungeons & Dragons), an archdevil in the Dungeons & Dragons role-playing game
 Moloch: Book of Angels Volume 6, a 2006 album by pianist Uri Caine composed by John Zorn 
 Moloch: or, This Gentile World, the first novel written by Henry Miller, unpublished until 1992
 Moloch (Kuprin novel), an 1896 novel by Alexander Kuprin
 Moloch (Mortal Kombat), a character in the Mortal Kombat video game series
 Moloch (Buffyverse), a demon in the TV show Buffy the Vampire Slayer
 Moloc (Stargate), a Goa'uld from Stargate SG-1
 Hylobates moloch, commonly known as the Silvery gibbon lives exclusively in Java, Indonesia

See also
Moloch in popular culture